Zak David Zilesnick (born 1 March 1995 in London), better known as Zak Abel, is an English-Moroccan singer, songwriter and musician. He has also been an English Cadet national table tennis champion.

Early and personal life
His father, who had been born in Morocco and emigrated to Israel, died when Zilesnick was 12 years old.  Zilesnick is Jewish. He grew up in Hendon with his mother Rachel, and attended the Jewish state school Matilda Marks, and University College School, from which he graduated in 2013.  He has moved to Hackney.

Zilesnick is a vegan.

Musician
Zilesnick won a competition to sing at a Yom Haatzmaut celebration in Wembley Stadium when he was in primary school.

He is most notable for his featured appearance on the UK top 20 hit "Unmissable" with Gorgon City. He has also released two extended plays, entitled Joker presents Zak Abel and One Hand on the Future.

In 2016, he worked with producers such as Kaytranada and Wookie on his debut album, Only When We're Naked, which was released on 6 October 2017, and debuted at number 100 on the UK Albums Chart. He was signed by Atlantic Records.

Table tennis
He was ranked No. 1 in the Cadet age group in England and was 2009 Cadet Boys' Singles national champion at the age of 14; he was also ranked No. 5 for under 18s in England. Between 2008 and 2010 he won the Under 15 national singles and Under 18 doubles titles.  In 2010 he was ranked number 39 in the senior category.

Discography

Studio albums

Extended plays

Singles
As lead artist

As featured artist

Other appearances

Songwriting credits

References

External links
Official website
Instagram

1995 births
Living people
British contemporary R&B singers
English male singer-songwriters
English soul singers
English Jews
Jewish table tennis players
British people of Moroccan-Jewish descent
People from Hendon
People from the London Borough of Hackney
21st-century English male singers
21st-century English singers
English male table tennis players